A steering linkage is the part of an automotive steering system that connects to the front wheels.

The steering linkage which connects the steering gearbox to the front wheels consists of a number of rods.   These rods are connected with a socket arrangement similar to a ball joint, called a tie rod end, allowing the linkage to move back and forth freely so that the steering effort will not interfere with the vehicles up-and-down motion as the wheel moves over roads .  The steering gears are attached to a rear rod which moves when the steering wheel is turned.  The rear rod is supported at one end.

Technology
Most modern cars have a full mechanical steering linkage system, but a recent innovation is the steer by wire system.

Example Simulations

See also
 Bump steer
 Parallelogram steering linkage

References

External links

Video clips
 Movement of a steering linkage

Automotive steering technologies
Linkages (mechanical)